Inverness Burghs was a district of burghs constituency of the House of Commons of the Parliament of Great Britain (at Westminster) from 1708 to 1801 and of the Parliament of the United Kingdom (also at Westminster) from 1801 to 1918. It elected one Member of Parliament (MP).

There was also, 1708 to 1918, the Inverness-shire constituency, which was, as its name implies, a county constituency.

Creation
The British parliamentary constituency was created in 1708 following the Acts of Union, 1707 and replaced the former Parliament of Scotland burgh constituencies of Inverness, Forres, Fortrose and Nairn.

Boundaries

As first used in the 1708 general election Inverness Burghs consisted of four burghs: Inverness in the county of Inverness, Fortrose in the county of Ross, Forres in the county of Elgin and Nairn in the county of Nairn.

History
The constituency elected one Member of Parliament (MP) by the first past the post system until the seat was abolished for the 1918 general election.

For the 1832 general election, as a result of the Representation of the People (Scotland) Act 1832, the boundaries of burghs for parliamentary election purposes ceased to be necessarily those for other purposes.

In 1918,  as a result of the Representation of the People Act 1918, the component burghs of Inverness Burghs were merged into three different county constituencies:  Inverness into the Inverness constituency, Forres and Nairn into the Moray and Nairn constituency and Fortrose into the Ross and Cromarty constituency. By this date, the county of Elgin had become the county of Moray and the county of Ross had been merged with the county of Cromarty to form the county of Ross and Cromarty.

Members of Parliament

Election results
The original electoral system for this constituency gave each of the four burghs one vote, with an additional casting vote (to break ties) for the burgh where the election was held. The place of election rotated amongst the burghs in successive Parliaments. The vote of a burgh was exercised by a burgh commissioner, who was elected by the burgh councillors.

The first direct election in Inverness Burghs was in 1832. The votes from qualified electors, in each burgh, were added together to establish the result.

Unless otherwise indicated, the primary source for the results was Craig. Candidates identified by Craig as Conservatives, in the 1832-1835 Parliament, are listed as Tories. In results for elections before the formal creation of the Liberal Party, shortly after the 1859 general election, candidates identified by Craig as Liberals are divided into Whigs and Radicals following Stooks Smith. Craig's registered electorate and vote figures are sometimes different from those of Stooks Smith, but Craig's figures are used below. For details of the books of Craig and Stooks Smith, see the Reference section below.

In terms of change in % votes and swing, the Conservative candidate in 1835 is related to his performance as the Tory candidate in the 1833 by-election. As there were two Tory candidates in 1832, no swing figure was calculated for the 1833 by-election.

Elections in the 1760s
This is an example of a contested election, before the extension of the franchise in 1832. The election took place in Fortrose, so that burgh's commissioner had the casting vote which decided the election.

Elections in the 1830s

 Death of Baillie in April 1833

Elections of the 1840s
 Resignation of Macleod in March 1840

Elections of the 1850s

Elections of the 1860s

Elections of the 1870s

Elections in the 1880s

 Note (1886): Shortly before the 1886 general election, the Liberal Party split. Finlay joined the new Liberal Unionist Party.

Elections of the 1890s

 Seat vacated on the appointment of Finlay as Solicitor General for England and Wales

Elections of the 1900s

 Note (1900): Change and swing figures are calculated from the 1895 general election.

Elections of the 1910s

 Constituency abolished (1918)

Notes

References
 Boundaries of Parliamentary Constituencies 1885-1972, compiled and edited by F.W.S. Craig (Parliamentary Reference Publications 1972)
 British Parliamentary Election Results 1832-1885, compiled and edited by F.W.S. Craig (Macmillan Press 1977)
 British Parliamentary Election Results 1885-1918, compiled and edited by F.W.S. Craig (Macmillan Press 1974)
 The House of Commons 1754-1790, by Sir Lewis Namier and John Brooke (HMSO 1964)
 The Parliaments of England by Henry Stooks Smith (1st edition published in three volumes 1844–50), second edition edited (in one volume) by F.W.S. Craig (Political Reference Publications 1973)
 Who's Who of British Members of Parliament: Volume I 1832-1885, edited by M. Stenton (The Harvester Press 1976)
 Who's Who of British Members of Parliament, Volume II 1886-1918, edited by M. Stenton and S. Lees (Harvester Press 1978)

See also
Former United Kingdom Parliament constituencies

Historic parliamentary constituencies in Scotland (Westminster)
Constituencies of the Parliament of the United Kingdom established in 1708
Constituencies of the Parliament of the United Kingdom disestablished in 1918
Politics of the county of Inverness
Politics of the county of Nairn
Politics of the county of Ross
Politics of the county of Ross and Cromarty